Gay, Straight, and the Reason Why: The Science of Sexual Orientation (2011; second edition 2016) is a book by the neuroscientist Simon LeVay and published by Oxford University Press. The book received mainly positive reviews, praising it for LeVay's wide-ranging overview of scientific research on sexual orientation. In 2012, it received the Bullough Book Award for the most distinguished book written for the professional sexological community published in a given year.

Bibliography
Books

 
 

Journals

  
 
  
  
  
  
  
  
  
  

Online articles

External links
Author's summary of the book

2011 non-fiction books
Books by Simon LeVay
English-language books
Non-fiction books about same-sex sexuality
Oxford University Press books
Popular science books
Sexual orientation and science